Rasar State Park ( "racer") is a public recreation area located on the north bank of the Skagit River,  west of Concrete in Skagit County, Washington. The state park's  include  of river shoreline; it is managed by the Washington State Parks and Recreation Commission.

History
The park began with Daniel Rasar's donation of 128 acres for park use in 1984. An additional 40 acres located north of Cape Horn Road were acquired in 1990. Funding to develop the park was approved in 1991, with construction using locally found materials taking place from 1993 to 1997. The park was dedicated on July 12, 1997, and named for Peter Rasar, the first known member of the Rasar family to emigrate to the area.

Activities and amenities
The park offers campsites and cabins,  of hiking trails including  of ADA-accessible trail, fishing, birdwatching, wildlife viewing, and interpretive activities.

References

External links
Rasar State Park Washington State Parks and Recreation Commission 
Rasar State Park Map Washington State Parks and Recreation Commission

Parks in Skagit County, Washington
State parks of Washington (state)
Protected areas established in 1984